Allette Brooks is an American folk singer-songwriter from Long Beach, California. She graduated from Stanford University, majoring in human biology. Her song "Silicon Valley Rebel", about a feminist Web designer who "comes in to work every day in her bike shorts and political T-shirts", was featured in "Silicon Valley USA", a BBC radio documentary. She also teaches Forrest yoga and Restorative Yoga.

Discography
 Privilege (1996)
 Silicon Valley Rebel (1999)
 Swim With Me (2001)
 Blaze (2008)

References

External links
Official Website

Songwriters from California
American folk musicians
Musicians from Long Beach, California
Stanford University alumni
American women singers
Living people
Writers from Long Beach, California
Singers from California
Year of birth missing (living people)
21st-century American women